The USNO CCD Astrograph Catalog (UCAC) is an astrometric star catalog of the United States Naval Observatory.

UCAC-1
The first preliminary edition, published in March 2000, gives the positions and proper motions of over 27 million stars in the southern hemisphere in the brightness range 8-16.

UCAC-2
The second issue was the IAU published General Assembly in Sydney (2003) and includes positions and proper motions of about 50 million stars.

UCAC-3
The third edition was published in the IAU General Assembly in Rio (August 2009).

UCAC-4
The fourth edition was published in August 2012.

Since Spring 2015, the successor URAT is available.

UCAC-5
The fifth edition was published in February 2017.

References

External links
UCAC home page

Astronomical catalogues of stars